Chae Seon-Ah (born ) is a South Korean female volleyball player. She was part of the South Korea women's national volleyball team.

She participated in the 2015 FIVB Volleyball Women's World Cup.
On club level she played for IBK in 2015.

References

External links
 Profile at FIVB.org

1992 births
Living people
South Korean women's volleyball players
Place of birth missing (living people)